This is a list of notable events in country music that took place in the year 1942.

Events 
 March 18, 20, 21 - Al Dexter holds 3-day recording sessions at CBS Sunset Studios, jamming with top session musicians, and recording around 20 songs. The coming musicians strike was not foreseen at the time, but the extensive recording helped Dexter release singles until 1945, when Columbia finally settled with the union, and Dexter was able to record new material.
 August 1 – The American Federation of Musicians authorizes a ban on recording by bands following a dispute over musicians' royalties; many country and popular music singers opt to continue recording without musical backing. The strike – which came to be known as the Petrillo ban – lingers into 1943.
 October 3 – Acuff-Rose Music, Inc., is incorporated in Tennessee. Fred Rose is the chief of creative activities, while Mildred Acuff takes care of business matters. Subsidiary corporations formed were Acuff-Rose Publications, Inc. (for BMI affiliated artists) and Milene Music, Inc. (ASCAP affiliated publisher). The former published four songs on January 28, 1943, all Fred Rose compositions under the pseudonym "Floyd Jenkins." "Low and lonely" and "Pins and Needles (In My Heart)" were two of the songs (see 1943 Top Hits of the Year).

Top Hillbilly-Folk (Country) Recordings 1942

The Top Hillbilly-Folk Records of the Year chart was derived from Billboard magazine's 'Hillbilly Hits' chart from January and February 1942, then The Billboard's weekly "American Folk Records" columns Feb-December 1942, with raw reports from nationwide jukebox operators, and summaries of the top records in the nation. Supplemental information came from 'Joel Whitburn's Pop Memories 1890-1954', record sales reported on the "Discography of American Historical Recordings" website, and other sources as specified. As always, numerical rankings are approximate.

Births 
 January 21 – Mac Davis, singer-songwriter who rose to prominence in the 1970s. (died 2020)
 March 15 – Wayland Holyfield, songwriter whose compositions were popular during the 1970s and 1980s.
 March 19 – Richard Dobson, singer-songwriter (died 2017).
 March 26 – Larry Butler, producer best known for his association with Kenny Rogers (died 2012).
 May 5 – Tammy Wynette, "The First Lady of Country Music" (died 1998).
 May 8 – Jack Blanchard, singer-songwriter who, with wife Misty Morgan, had a string of animal-themed hit recordings in the 1970s.
 May 15 – K. T. Oslin, singer who rose to fame during the 1980s, after she had reached her mid-40s (died 2020).
 August 7 – B.J. Thomas, pop-styled vocalist of the 1970s and 1980s. (Died  (died 2021)
 September 6 – Mel McDaniel, honky tonk-styled singer of the 1980s (died 2011).
 October 27 – Lee Greenwood, singer-songwriter of the 1980s, best known for the patriotic anthem "God Bless the USA".
 November 8 – Donnie Fritts, American session musician and songwriter (died 2019).

Deaths

Further reading 
 Kingsbury, Paul, "Vinyl Hayride: Country Music Album Covers 1947–1989," Country Music Foundation, 2003
 Millard, Bob, "Country Music: 70 Years of America's Favorite Music," HarperCollins, New York, 1993
 Whitburn, Joel. "Joel Whitburn's Pop Memories 1890–1954: The History of American Popular Music," Record Research Inc., Menomonee Falls, Wisconsin, 1986.

References

Country
Country music by year